Henrik Bech (c.1718 – 1776) was a Danish-born wood carver who settled in Norway from around 1750. He was born in Copenhagen.

His first commission in Norway was to design oven plates for Moss Jernverk, and subsequently for several other ironworks. He also contributed to the decoration of churches, in particular Kongsberg Church, where he sculptured parts of the pulpit, altar, and the king's chair.

References

1718 births
1776 deaths
Artists from Copenhagen
Danish emigrants to Norway
Norwegian woodcarvers